Underdog is a 2001 novel by Swedish author Torbjörn Flygt. It won the August Prize in 2001.

References

2001 Swedish novels
Swedish-language novels
August Prize-winning works
Malmö
Novels set in Sweden